Kerala State Film Development Corporation (abbreviated as KSFDC), is an organization founded by the Government of Kerala, India for promoting the film market in the state. It was founded in 1975, a period when the production of Malayalam films were centered in Madras (now Chennai). KSFDC was formed with an objective of moving the Malayalam film industry from Madras to Kerala. At the time of its inception, it was the first of its kind organization for film development under public sector in India.

KSFDC organised the International Film Festival of Kerala annually until 1998, after which its management was handed over to the Kerala State Chalachitra Academy. KSFDC is the founder of the Chithranjali Studio. KSFDC owns a cinema exhibition network of ten theatres across Kerala. KSFDC also works as a production agency which makes public interest documentary films and short films for the Government of Kerala. Shaji N. Karun is appointed as the new chairman of Kerala State Film Development Corporation after the demise of previous chairman Lenin Rajendran

History
The demand for a studio in the public domain was first put forward by filmmaker Ramu Kariat, his idea was to make one in the lines of Moscow Film Studio, He, along with like minded filmmakers P. Bhaskaran and Thoppil Bhasi and many others met C. Achutha Menon, the then chief minister who in turn directed them to the then home minister K. Karunakaran who also looked after state's cinema. Karunakaran and the then secretary of government Malayattoor Ramakrishnan supported the demand. In 1975, the Kerala State Film Development Corporation (KSFDC) was formed with P. R. S. Pillai as its first chairman and G. Vivekanandan as the first managing director.

Subsidiaries

Chithranjali Studio

Kalabhavan Digital Studio 
A digital post processing studio owned by the KSFDC.

Cinemas 
KSFDC owns an exhibition network of 17 cinemas in Kerala namely:

 Kairali, Nila and Sree theatre complex, Thampanoor, Thiruvananthapuram
 Lenin cinemas, KSRTC Central Bus Station complex, Thampanoor, Thiruvananthapuram
 Kalabhavan Theatre, Chalachitrakalabhavan, Vazhuthacaud, Thiruvananthapuram
 Kairali & Sree twin theatres, Karunakaran Nambiar Road, Round North, Thrissur
 Kairali & Sree twin theatres, (I.G Road) Mavoor Road, Kozhikode
 Kairali & Sree twin theatres, Mullakkal, Alappuzha
 Kairali & Sree twin theatres,  A.C Road Cherthala, Alappuzha District
 Kairali & Sree twin theatres, Pullomkulam, North Paravur, Ernakulam District
 Kairali & Sree twin theatres, Chittoor, Palakkad District

Film Production
KSFDC has produced 2 movies namely Divorce and Nishiddho for women empowerment to uplift the works of women directors.

See also 
 Chithranjali Studio

References 

State agencies of Kerala
Film organisations in India
Malayalam cinema
Organisations based in Thiruvananthapuram
Government agencies established in 1975
1975 establishments in Kerala